Bushe is the surname of:
 Paul Bushe (1492-1558), First Bishop of Bristol
 Amyas Bushe(1665-1730) Sheriff, MP, fought for James II at Battle of the Boyne
 Gervase Parker Bushe (1744–1793) Irish lawyer and MP
 Charles Kendal Bushe (1767–1843) Irish judge 
 John Scott Bushe ( - 1887) Colonial Secretary, Trinidad BWI
 Eddie Bushe (b. 1951)  Irish former cricketer
 Jonathan Bushe (b. 1978) Irish cricketer
 Henry Grattan Bushe (1886 –1961), Governor of Barbados
 Gervase Roy Bushe (b. 1955) Professor, Simon Fraser University
 Raymond 'Ray' Bushe (b. 1942) Irish Footballer
 Jason Bushe (b.1969) Irish Footballer

See also
 Bush (surname)
 Bushe River 207 Indian reserve in Alberta, Canada